Events in the year 1946 in Japan.

Incumbents
Emperor: Hirohito
Prime Minister: Kijuro Shidehara, Shigeru Yoshida
Supreme Commander Allied Powers: Douglas MacArthur

Governors
Aichi Prefecture: 
 until 25 January: Ryuichi Fukumoto
 25 January-9 July: Saburo Hayakawa
 starting 9 July: Mikine Kuwahara
Akita Prefecture: 
 until 25 January: Kinsaburo Ikeda
 25 January-9 July: Iwao Isobe
 starting 9 July: Hasuika Kosaku
Aomori Prefecture: Motohiko Kanai (until 25 January); Renichi Ono (starting 25 January)
Ehime Prefecture: Shotaro Toshima (until 4 October); Juushin Aoki (starting 4 October)
Fukui Prefecture: 
 until 25 May: Eminai Miyata
 25 May-4 October: Saito Takeo
 starting 4 October: Harukazu Obata 
Fukushima Prefecture: Masuda Kashinanatsu (until 25 April); Kanichiro Ishihara (starting 25 April)
Gifu Prefecture: Yoshihira Nomura (until 16 February); Naomi Momoi (starting 16 February)
Gunma Prefecture: Toshio Takahashi (until 25 January); Shigeo Kitano (starting 25 January)
Hiroshima Prefecture: Tsunei Kusunose
Ibaraki Prefecture: Yoji Tomosue
Iwate Prefecture: Tamemasu Miyata (until 26 January); Haruhiko Ichi (starting 26 January)
Kagawa Prefecture: Shogo Tanaka
Kochi Prefecture: Nagano Yoshitatsu
Kumamoto Prefecture: 
 until 25 January: Hirai Fumi
 25 January-9 July: Hiroshi Nagai
 starting 9 July: Saburo Sakurai
Kyoto Prefecture: Atsushi Kimura
Mie Prefecture: Kobayashi Chiaki
Miyagi Prefecture: Saburo Chiba
Miyazaki Prefecture: Tadao Annaka
Nagano Prefecture: Monobe Kaoruro
Niigata Prefecture: 
 until 25 January: Hatada Masatomi
 25 January-9 July: Sato Dodai
 starting 9 July: Hideo Aoki
Okinawa Prefecture: Koshin Shikiya (until 24 April)
Saga Prefecture: Miyazaki Kenta (until 4 July); Genichi Okimori (starting 4 July)
Saitama Prefecture: Sekigaiyo Otoko (until 25 January); Jitzuzo Nishimura (starting 25 January)
Shiname Prefecture:
 until 25 January: Kiyoshi Ito
 25 January-8 June: Mikio Suzuki
 starting 8 June: Muneo Tokanai
Tochigi Prefecture: Soma Toshio
Tokyo: 
 until 15 January: Shohei Fujinuma
 15 January-8 June: Haruo Matsui
 starting 8 June: Seiichiro Yasui
Toyama Prefecture: 
 until 25 January: Keiichi Yoshitake
 25 January-9 July: Keiichi Tanaki
 starting 9 July: Keiji Ishimura
Yamagata Prefecture: Michio Murayama (until 25 October); Yoshio Miura (starting 25 October)

Events

January 1: Emperor Shōwa renounces his divinity, known in Japanese as the Human Declaration
January 4: The Supreme Commander of the Allied Powers, General Douglas MacArthur order the Japanese government to expel all militarists from positions of power. The disbandment of all ultra-nationalist organizations is also ordered.
March 2: Kose Cosmetics founded in Oji region, Tokyo, as predecessor name was Kobayashi Kose Cosmetics.
April 10: The Diet elections (a lower House of Representatives and upper House of Peers). Liberal Party wins 141 of 466 Diet seats, followed by the Progressive Party with 94 and the Socialist Party with 93.
April 16: Kijuro Shidehara resigns as president of the Progressive Party, and as prime minister effective April 22.
April 22: Sazae-san is first published.
May 2: Ichiro Hatoyama receives Imperial Order to form a cabinet.
May 3: International Military Tribunal for the Far East convenes.
May 4: Supreme Commander of the Allied Powers ("SCAP") purges Hatoyama.
May 7: Tokyo Tsushin Kogyo, the predecessor of Sony, is founded.
May 16: Shigeru Yoshida receives Imperial Order to form a cabinet.
May 22: Yoshida cabinet announced.
June 20:  Emperor Hirohito submits a revision of the Imperial Constitution to the Diet.
August 16: Keidanren established.
August 20: Serial killer Yoshio Kodaira is arrested.
November 3: Constitution of Japan promulgated.
December 21: The Nankai earthquake strikes Wakayama Prefecture, killing at least one thousand people and destroying 36,000 homes.

Births
January 2: Gorou Ibuki, actor
February 3: Takako Iida, volleyball player
February 19: Hiroshi Fujioka, actor
February 22: Kumiko Sato, figure skater
February 23: Ryudō Uzaki, singer-songwriter 
March 4: Kiyoshi Nakajō, enka singer 
March 21: Yumiko Kokonoe, actress and singer 
April 5: Takurō Yoshida, singer-songwriter 
May 7: Man Arai, composer, writer and singer (d. 2021)
June 1: Yūko Shiokawa, violinist
June 2: Tomomichi Nishimura, voice actor
June 6
 Masaaki Sakai, singer and actor 
 Mie Nakao, singer and actress
June 9: Kazumi Takahashi, former professional baseball pitcher (d. 2015)
July 1: Masaharu Satō, voice actor
July 16: Toshio Furukawa, voice actor and narrator
August 2: Kenji Nakagami, novelist and essayist (d. 1992)
August 6: Ichikawa Danjūrō, actor (d. 2013)
August 18: Masaaki Ikenaga, former professional baseball pitcher (d. 2022)
August 21: Norio Yoshimizu, football player
September 18: Akira Kamiya, voice actor
September 24: Kōichi Tabuchi, former professional baseball player 
October 10: Naoto Kan, politician and prime minister of Japan
October 11: Sawao Katō, gymnast
October 25: Kōji Yamamoto, former professional baseball player and coach 
October 30: Katsuhisa Hōki, actor and voice actor
November 3: Wataru Takeshita, politician (d. 2021)
November 4: Isamu Sonoda, judoka
November 6: Tsuguhiko Kozuka, figure skater
November 13: Reiko Ohara, actress (d. 2009)
November 14: Kai Atō, actor and TV presenter (d. 2015)
November 22: Mitsuko Baisho, actress
November 28: Kazuhiro Ninomiya, judoka
December 4: Yō Inoue, voice actress (d. 2003)
December 14: Hiroshi Nagakubo, pair skater

Deaths
January 30: Kan Abe, politician (b. 1894)
February 10: Mushitaro Oguri, novelist (b. 1901)
February 13: Tamotsu Oishi, career officer (b. 1900)
February 23: Tomoyuki Yamashita, general (b. 1885)
April 3: Masaharu Homma, lieutenant general (b. 1887)
April 5: Fujiro Katsurada, parasitologist (b. 1867)
April 19: Rikichi Andō, general (b. 1884)
May 26: Tamaki Miura, operatic soprano (b. 1884)
June 12: Hisaichi Terauchi, marshal (b. 1879)
June 26: Yōsuke Matsuoka, diplomat and Minister of Foreign Affairs (b. 1880)
August 16: Prince Fushimi Hiroyasu (b. 1875)
September 24: Yoshio Tachibana, lieutenant general (b. 1890)
September 30: Takashi Sakai, lieutenant general (b. 1887)
December 7: Sada Yacco, geisha, actress and dancer (b. 1871)
December 12: Gennosuke Fuse, anatomist (b. 1880)

See also
 List of Japanese films of the 1940s

References

 
Years of the 20th century in Japan
1940s in Japan